Colonel Derek Wilford, OBE, is a former British Army officer who commanded the 1st Battalion, Parachute Regiment.

In Derry, Northern Ireland on Bloody Sunday he was in command, when soldiers within his battalion shot 26 unarmed civilian protesters. At the time he was a lieutenant colonel. The following year he was awarded the OBE by Queen Elizabeth II, widely seen as a reward for his part in Bloody Sunday. The Saville Inquiry into the incident found that he had ignored orders, without justification, and in doing so had "set in train" the shootings.

Northern Ireland
Wilford was exonerated by the Widgery tribunal that April and on 3 October 1972 he was appointed an Officer of the Order of the British Empire (OBE). This act was widely interpreted as both a reward for his part in Bloody Sunday and a gesture of solidarity for him by the British establishment. However, the Saville Inquiry, many years later, determined that Wilford had expressly disobeyed an order from a superior officer, Brigadier Pat MacLellan, who prohibited Wilford from sending troops into the Bogside. The Saville Inquiry found that MacLellan was not to blame for the shootings. Lord Saville said Colonel Wilford was wrong to send soldiers into an unfamiliar area where there was a risk of attack from Irish republican paramilitaries, in circumstances where the soldiers' response would risk civilians being killed or injured.

Saville suggested Wilford "wanted to demonstrate the way to deal with rioters in Derry was not for soldiers to shelter behind barricades like (as he put it) Aunt Sallies while being stoned, as he perceived the local troops had been doing, but instead to go aggressively after rioters, as he and his soldiers had been doing in Belfast". He added: "His failure to comply with his orders, instead setting in train the very thing his brigadier has prohibited him from doing, cannot be justified...Colonel Wilford should not have launched an incursion into the Bogside."

Aftermath
Wilford was known locally in Derry in the aftermath as the 'Butcher of the Bogside'. On 4 November 1972, Wilford captured the Ulster Volunteer Force leader Gusty Spence, then on the run from prison.

Wilford has been outspoken against the criticism of his leadership and has always defended the actions of his soldiers since the incident. He always maintained his soldiers were fired upon first and in 1992 in a BBC documentary he stated "I don't believe my soldiers were wrong", reasoning "If you get into an enormous crowd which is out to make mischief you are in the first instance a party to it." In 1998 he stated he was angry at Tony Blair's intention of setting up the Saville Inquiry and that he should not apologise for it. In 1999, speaking on BBC radio he "suggest[ed] that almost all Northern Ireland Catholics were closet republicans".  This reportedly angered family members of some victims. He later apologised for his comments, yet "the army distanced itself from him".

Wilford has claimed he has been made a scapegoat since that day and has been abandoned by the military hierarchy and British Government. Despite this he didn't retire from the army until 1983, although he stated he felt constantly passed over for promotion, ending his career only one rank higher than his 1972 rank.

Personal life
In 2000, Wilford was living outside the United Kingdom. According to the Derry Journal, as of 2010, he had been living in Belgium for a number of years with his new wife and daughter. In the wake of the release of the Saville report, he has refused to make any further comments, stating "I don't want to talk about it. It's all been said."

In 2010, he was incorrectly reported by RTE and the BBC to have died.

References

External links
 "Bloody Sunday paratroopers defend senior officer" (The Guardian)

1930s births
Living people
British expatriates in Belgium
British Parachute Regiment officers
Place of birth missing (living people)
Date of birth missing (living people)
Officers of the Order of the British Empire